The Yakutat Block is a terrane in the process of accreting to the North American continent along the south central coast of Alaska. It has been displaced about  northward since the Cenozoic along the Queen Charlotte-Fairweather fault system.

The Yakutat Block is bounded on the northeast by the Fairweather Fault, and on the north by a system of thrust and possibly strike-slip faults in the Chugach Mountains and St. Elias Mountains. The Yakutat Block is bounded on its southwest side by an as yet undefined underwater geologic feature known as the Transition Zone. Global Positioning System (GPS) measurements indicate that the Yakutat block has a distinctive velocity relative to both the Pacific Plate and the North American Plate. Thus it appears to be a terrane in the process of accreting rather than a block already sutured on to the Pacific or North American plate.

South of Yakutat Bay, the boundary between the Yakutat block and the North American plate is once again along the Fairweather Fault. The convergence rate is among the highest in the world within continental crust, surpassing even that which is occurring between the Indo-Australian Plate and the Eurasian Plate which is lifting the Himalayas.

References
 Active Accretion of the Yakutat Block to North America, by Freymueller, J. T.; Larsen, C. F.; Fletcher, H. J.; Echelmeyer, K.; Motyka, R. J.  Published 2002 by the American Geophysical Union. 

Terranes
Geology of Alaska